Lešnica is a settlement north of Ormož in northeastern Slovenia. The area belongs to the traditional region of Styria and is now included in the Drava Statistical Region.

References

External links
Lešnica on Geopedia

Populated places in the Municipality of Ormož